Ned Fowler (born January 16, 1944) is a retired American college basketball coach.

He is a graduate of East Texas State University. His first experience as a head coach was five years at Richard King High School from 1969 to 1974. He served in a similar capacity at Tyler Junior College (TJC) for seven seasons from 1974 to 1981. The Apaches had a 31–4 record and were ranked third in the final National Junior College Athletic Association men's basketball rankings in Fowler's last campaign at TJC.

He succeeded Roy Danforth as head coach at Tulane University on March 17, 1981. He resigned from his position on April 4, 1985, amid allegations of National Collegiate Athletic Association (NCAA) rules violations involving cash payments to his players. New Orleans lawyer and volunteer district attorney Edward F. Kohnke said about Fowler, "His was the sin of caring. If a politician had done what he did, he would have been returned to office." The university cancelled the men's basketball program that same day as a result of a point shaving scandal involving five Green Wave players including John "Hot Rod" Williams, to which Fowler was oblivious. Green Wave men's basketball wouldn't return until the 1989–90 season.

He stayed in New Orleans for two more years, working in real estate development and insurance for Tulane alumni. He returned to college basketball upon being named an assistant coach on Sonny Smith's staff at Auburn University on July 23, 1987. He coordinated the Tigers' defense.

Fowler returned to head coaching at Stephen F. Austin State University where he served for six years from 1990 to 1996. He was fired on March 18, 1996, despite the Lumberjacks having its best season during his tenure with a 17–11 overall record, 11–7 in Southland Conference play.

Head coaching record

References

External links

1944 births
American men's basketball coaches
College men's basketball head coaches in the United States
Junior college men's basketball coaches in the United States
Stephen F. Austin Lumberjacks basketball coaches
Tulane Green Wave men's basketball coaches
High school basketball coaches in Texas
Living people